Alexander Renkert (born March 26, 1993) is an American trampoline gymnast.

He won the silver medal in the men's double mini event at the 2017 World Games held in Wrocław, Poland.

In 2019, he won the bronze medal in the men's double mini event at the Trampoline World Championships in Tokyo, Japan.

References

External links 
 

Living people
1993 births
Place of birth missing (living people)
American male trampolinists
Medalists at the Trampoline Gymnastics World Championships
Competitors at the 2017 World Games
World Games silver medalists
21st-century American people